Smoljana is a village in the municipality of Bosanski Petrovac, Bosnia and Herzegovina.

Demographics 
According to the 2013 census, its population was 151.

References

Populated places in Bosanski Petrovac
Serb communities in the Federation of Bosnia and Herzegovina